Xyphosiini is a tribe of fruit flies in the family Tephritidae.

Genera
Epochrinopsis Hering, 1939
Gymnocarena Hering, 1940
Icterica Loew, 1873
Ictericodes Hering, 1942
Xyphosia Robineau-Desvoidy, 1830

References

Tephritinae
Diptera tribes